Hum is a hill located on the island of Lastovo, in the Adriatic Sea and Croatia.

References

Mountains of Croatia
Lastovo
Landforms of Dubrovnik-Neretva County